Depressaria subalbipunctella is a moth of the family Depressariidae. It is found in Russia and Ukraine.

References

External links
lepiforum.de

Moths described in 1981
Depressaria
Moths of Europe